Riga Sports Palace was an ice hockey arena in Riga, Latvia. It was built in 1970 with 4,500 permanent seats with a total capacity of 5,500 including room for 500 standing spectators.

In the 1970s and 1980s, it was the home arena for the renowned ice hockey club Dinamo Riga and also frequently hosted figure skating, basketball, and tennis events.

From 1990 until 2006 it was the home to the Latvian national ice hockey team and until end of the 1990s was host of almost all Latvian Hockey League teams. However, since 2006 Latvian national ice hockey team has been played its home games in the 10,300-seat Arena Riga that was built to host the 2006 Men's World Ice Hockey Championships. Chief of arena for long term was legendary ice hockey player Helmuts Balderis.

The last owner of arena Jānis Leimanis announced his plans to renew the arena and area near arena (starting at summer 2007). His aim was to make it more suitable for residential and commercial needs – to build flats, offices, hotels and keep renewed ice hall itself.

Rīgas Sporta Pils was demolished in 2007.

Notes

Buildings and structures in Riga
Sports venues completed in 1970
Buildings and structures demolished in 2007
Indoor arenas built in the Soviet Union
Indoor arenas in Latvia
Indoor ice hockey venues in Latvia